Of the 65 cardinals eligible to participate, 57 served as cardinal electors in the 1914 papal conclave. Arranged by region and within each alphabetically. Eight did not participate in the conclave. William Henry O'Connell and James Gibbons arrived too late from the United States, as did Louis-Nazaire Bégin from Quebec. Sebastiano Martinelli, Franziskus von Sales Bauer, Kolos Ferenc Vaszary, Giuseppe Antonio Ermenegildo Prisco, and François-Virgile Dubillard were too ill or too frail.

Italy
Antonio Agliardi, Apostolic Chancellor
Ottavio Cagiano de Azevedo, Prefect of Religious
Domenico Ferrata, Secretary of Holy Office
Pietro Gasparri, Camerlengo of the College of Cardinals
Filippo Giustini, Secretary of Discipline of the Sacraments
Girolamo Maria Gotti, OCD, Prefect of Propagation of the Faith
Gaetano de Lai, Secretary of Consistorial
Michele Lega, Counselor of Holy Office
Benedetto Lorenzelli, Prefect of Studies
Rafael Merry del Val, Vatican Secretary of State
Francesco di Paola Cassetta, Prefect of Council
Angelo Di Pietro, Apostolic Datary
Aristide Rinaldini, Camerlengo emeritus of the College of Cardinals
Francesco Salesio Della Volpe, Camerlengo of the Holy Roman Church
Domenico Serafini, OSB, Assessor of Holy Office
Scipione Tecchi, Assessor of Consistorial, Secretary of College of Cardinals
Serafino Vannutelli, Dean of the College of Cardinals
Vincenzo Vannutelli, Prefect of Apostolic Signatura
Bartolomeo Bacilieri, Bishop of Verona
Gaetano Bisleti, Grand Prior of the Sovereign Order of Malta
Giulio Boschi, Archbishop of Ferrara
Aristide Cavallari, Patriarch of Venice
Giacomo della Chiesa, Archbishop of Bologna (was elected Pope and chose the name Benedict XV)
Diomede Falconio, OFM, Cardinal-Bishop of Velletri
Andrea Carlo Ferrari, Archbishop of Milan
Giuseppe Francica-Nava di Bontifé, Archbishop of Catania
Gennaro Granito Pignatelli di Belmonte, Nuncio emeritus to Austria-Hungary
Alessandro Lualdi, Archbishop of Palermo
Pietro Maffi, Archbishop of Pisa
Basilio Pompili, Vicar General of Rome
Agostino Richelmy, Archbishop of Turin
Antonio Vico, Nuncio to Spain

France
Léon-Adolphe Amette, Archbishop of Paris
Pierre Andrieu, Archbishop of Bordeaux
Louis Billot, SJ
Louis Luçon, Archbishop of Reims
François de Rovérié de Cabrières, Bishop of Montpellier
Hector Sévin, Archbishop of Lyon

Spain
Enrique Almaraz y Santos, Archbishop of Seville
José Cos y Macho, Archbishop of Valladolid
Victoriano Guisasola y Menendez, Archbishop of Toledo
José María Martín de Herrera y de la Iglesia, Archbishop of Santiago de Compostela

Austria-Hungary
János Csernoch, Archbishop of Esztergom
Károly Hornig, Bishop of Veszprém
Friedrich Gustav Piffl, CCRSA, Archbishop of Vienna
Lev Skrbenský z Hříště, Archbishop of Prague

United Kingdom of Great Britain and Ireland
Francis Bourne, Archbishop of Westminster
Michael Logue, Archbishop of Armagh
Francis Aidan Gasquet, OSB, President of Pontifical Commission for the Revision and Emendation of the Vulgate

German Empire
Franziskus von Bettinger, Archbishop of Münich und Freising
Felix von Hartmann, Archbishop of Cologne

Portugal
José Sebastião d'Almeida Neto, OFM, Patriarch emeritus of Lisbon
António Mendes Bello, Patriarch of Lisbon

Belgium
Désiré-Joseph Mercier, Archbishop of Mechelen

Brazil
Joaquim Arcoverde de Albuquerque Cavalcanti, Archbishop of São Sebastião de Rio de Janeiro

The Netherlands
Willem van Rossum, CSSR, President of Pontifical Biblical Commission

United States
John Murphy Farley, Archbishop of New York

Notes

References

Papal Elections of the 20th Century (1903-1978)

Pope Pius X
Pope Benedict XV
1914